Night Without Stars is a 1950 thriller novel by the British writer Winston Graham.

Film adaptation
In 1951 the novel was adapted into the film Night Without Stars directed by Anthony Pelissier and starring David Farrar and Nadia Gray.

References

Bibliography
 Goble, Alan. The Complete Index to Literary Sources in Film. Walter de Gruyter, 1999.
 Woods, Tim. Who's Who of Twentieth Century Novelists. Routledge, 2008.

1950 British novels
Novels by Winston Graham
British thriller novels
British novels adapted into films
Novels set in France
Hodder & Stoughton books